The Itinerario di la Gran Militia, a la Pavese ("Itinerary of the Great Army, in Pavese") is an anonymous 15th-century account of the First Crusade written in the dialect of Pavia. It relies almost entirely on William of Tyre as its source. It was published and translated into French in 1895.

Editions
Paul Riant, ed. and trans. "Itinerario di la Gran Militia, a la Pavese". Recueil des Historiens des Croisades, Historiens Occidentaux, Volume 5, XIII (Paris: Imprimerie Nationale, 1895), 649–89.

First Crusade
15th-century books
15th-century Christian texts
Texts about the Crusades